The Cerusa is a  stream of Liguria (Italy).

Geography 

The river is formed at 376 m by the confluence of two streams, Rio Gava and Rio delle Cave, in the Ligurian Apennines.  The river then flows through the Valle Cerusa and crosses the villages of Fiorino, Fabbriche di Voltri e Fullo. Heading south reaches Voltri and ends its course in the Ligurian Sea, after being crossed by Autostrada A10, Genoa–Ventimiglia railway and Aurelia national road.

Cerusa basin (24 km2) is totally included in the Province of Genova.

Main tributaries 
 Left hand:
 Rio delle Cave.
 Right hand:
 Rio Gava;
 Rio Secco.

History 
The Département de la Ceruse or Dipartimento della Cerusa of Ligurian Republic took its name at the end of the 18th century from the stream.

References

See also
 List of rivers of Italy

Rivers of Italy
Rivers of Liguria
Rivers of the Province of Genoa
Rivers of the Apennines
Drainage basins of the Ligurian Sea